Ana Bella Alexander Lamothe (born November 1, 1954) is a retired female athlete from Cuba, who mainly competed in the women's long jump event during her career.

References
 

1954 births
Living people
Cuban female long jumpers
Athletes (track and field) at the 1975 Pan American Games
Athletes (track and field) at the 1976 Summer Olympics
Athletes (track and field) at the 1979 Pan American Games
Olympic athletes of Cuba
Pan American Games gold medalists for Cuba
Pan American Games silver medalists for Cuba
Pan American Games medalists in athletics (track and field)
Medalists at the 1975 Pan American Games
Medalists at the 1979 Pan American Games
Central American and Caribbean Games medalists in athletics
20th-century Cuban women
20th-century Cuban people